Kaalamellam Kaathiruppen is 1997 Indian Tamil-language romantic drama film directed by R. Sundarrajan. The film stars Vijay and Dimple, while R. Sundarrajan, Jaishankar, Srividya, Karan, Manivannan play other pivotal roles. The film released on 14 January 1997. The film ended as a hit at the box office as it released on Pongal Festival, and the satellite rights of the film were sold to Sun TV for a good price and saw good viewership ratings and so later bought by Jaya TV on a sharing basis with Raj TV.

Plot
Kannan is the only son of Jaishankar and Lakshmi. He is very rich and spends a lot of money every day. Kannan is in charge of arranging the college cultural function. He happens to hear Manimegalai sing in a temple, and he asks her to sing in the college function by laying roads for her entire area, thereby repairing all plumbing problems. However, Manimegalai refuses, and all of Kannan's attempts to make her sing fail. In the process, Kannan falls in love with Manimegalai, but she hates him. She gets him arrested for eve teasing. Triggered by this, Kannan tries to marry Manimegalai by force, which fails miserably. Lakshmi then tells Kannan that he is not her biological son, but an adopted orphan, then she suddenly dies and her husband also becomes paralysed. Kannan has a change of heart and serves his immobile father. His father gives all his properties to Kannan and also passes two months later. Meanwhile, to forget all these and to start a new life, Manimegalai goes to Ooty and joins Raja's (Karan) company as the assistant manager. Kannan follows her, but this time, he wants to apologize to her. Kannan joins the same company where Manimegalai works as the owner's car driver. Manimegalai tries to make Kannan leave Ooty by any legal means. She also mistakenly accuses him of stealing cash from her table, which she had just placed inside the locker. Kannan is beaten and dismissed. Manimegalai then attempts suicide, but her neighbors save her. Raja comes to Manimegalai and reveals her mistake of accusing Kannan and also informs her that he has rehired Kannan as their company bus conductor. Manimegalai's father also informs her that Kannan has donated all his wealth to orphanages and has changed completely. Manaimegalai realizes her mistake and falls in love with Kannan. Initially, Kannan refuses, but when Raja kidnaps Manimegalai as he loves her too, Kannan saves her, and they reconcile. Raja also realizes his mistake and blesses them. Finally, Kannan and Manimegalai both live happily together in Ooty.

Cast

Release
The film was released on 14 January 1997, coinciding with Thai Pongal festival along with Mani Ratnam's political drama film Iruvar and Rajiv Menon's romantic dramedy film Minsara Kanavu. The satellite rights of the film were sold to Raj TV and later  Jaya TV on a sharing basis and Sun TV.

Soundtrack 
All songs were written by R. Sundarrajan himself. and composed by Deva

References

External links
 

1997 films
Films scored by Deva (composer)
1990s Tamil-language films
Films directed by R. Sundarrajan